Henriette Wegner (born 1 October 1805 in Hamburg, died 25 November 1875 in Christiania), née Henriette Seyler, was a Norwegian businesswoman and philanthropist, a member of the Hanseatic Berenberg banking dynasty of Hamburg and the wife of the Norwegian industrialist Benjamin Wegner. She was briefly a co-owner of Berenberg Bank, and was also noted for her work for the homeless in Norway. During her life she was a citizen of the city-republic of Hamburg, of France during the Napoleonic Wars, and finally of Norway from 1824.

Childhood in Hamburg

Born Henriette Seyler in the city-republic of Hamburg, she was the youngest daughter of the banker L.E. Seyler and Anna Henriette Gossler, and a granddaughter of the Swiss-born theatre director Abel Seyler and of the Hamburg bankers Johann Hinrich Gossler and Elisabeth Berenberg, whose Belgian-origined family had founded Berenberg Bank in 1590. Her father L.E. Seyler was a co-owner of Berenberg Bank for 48 years as well as President of the Commerz-Deputation and a member of the Hamburg Parliament, and her family was one of Hamburg's most prominent Hanseatic families. On her father's side, she was a descendant of the Swiss Calvinist theologian Friedrich Seyler and of the Basel patrician families Burckhardt, Socin, Merian, Faesch and Meyer zum Pfeil; on her mother's side she was also descended from families like Amsinck and Welser.

The year after her birth, Hamburg was occupied by Napoleonic France and then briefly incorporated into the Bouches-de-l'Elbe département of the French Empire, before again becoming a sovereign city-republic after the Napoleonic Wars. During the French occupation, her father was held as a hostage along with a handful of the city's other prominent merchants for some time, and Berenberg Bank later moved its headquarters to their private home. Like most of Hamburg's elite, the family was fiercely Anglophile.

Life in Norway

On 15 May 1824, she married the businessman Benjamin Wegner in St. Nicholas' Church, Hamburg; born in Königsberg, he had two years earlier moved to Norway as director-general and co-owner of the Blue Color Works, a mining company and the world's largest manufacturer of cobalt blue as well as Norway's largest industrial enterprise. He later also acquired several other enterprises and estates in Norway. They lived at Fossum Manor until 1836, when they acquired Frogner Manor in what is now the borough of Frogner in west end Oslo; the estate also included Frognerseteren and parts of Nordmarka. The 1820s neoclassical pavilion found in Frogner Park was a wedding gift given to her, which was moved from the family's former home Fossum Manor in the late 1830s.

As the wife of one of Norway's leading industrialists and mistress of Frogner Manor, she was one of the leading women of Norwegian high society, particularly from the 1830s, when the family moved from rural Modum to Frogner Manor outside the capital. Following the death of her father, she was a co-owner of Berenberg Bank in Hamburg until 31 December 1836, although her interests were managed by her brother-in-law. By contemporaries, she was described as a "lovable" character. She was also noted for her social commitment, and was chairwoman and board member of the Norwegian Charity for the Homeless for over twenty years. She also endowed a substantial amount to helping the homeless.

The author Willibald Alexis describes his visit to Benjamin and Henriette Wegner at Fossum Manor in the book Herbstreise durch Scandinavien ("An Autumn Journey through Scandinavia") from 1828.

She had six children, of which five survived into adulthood. Her oldest son Johann Ludwig Wegner (1830–1893) was a judge and married Blanca Bretteville, a daughter of Prime Minister Christian Zetlitz Bretteville; her second son Heinrich Benjamin Wegner (1833–1911) was a timber merchant and married Henriette Vibe, a daughter of the classical philologist Ludvig Vibe; her oldest daughter Sophie Wegner (1838–1906) married colonel and aide-de-camp to king Charles Hans Jacob Nørregaard; her youngest daughter Anna Henriette Wegner (1841–1918) married the theologian Bernhard Pauss; her youngest son George Wegner (1847–1881) was a supreme court barrister.

She was interred on 30 November 1875 at Gamle Aker Cemetery in Oslo.

References

Literature
Rolf B. Wegner (the Elder), Familien Wegner, Halden, 1963
Rolf B. Wegner (the Younger): Mine tippoldeforeldre Henriethe og Benjamin Wegner forteller, 2013

Berenberg-Gossler family
Berenberg Bank people
Norwegian humanitarians
1805 births
1875 deaths
German emigrants to Norway
Burials at Old Aker Cemetery
Seyler family